Franjo Arapović (born 2 June 1965) is a Croatian former professional basketball player who played as a  center. Four years earlier he was a member of the Yugoslavia national team, that won the silver medal at the 1988 Summer Olympics.

Arapović was born in Mostar, SR Bosnia and Herzegovina, SFR Yugoslavia. In his professional career, he played for KK Lokomotiva Mostar, after which he moved to Croatian clubs Cibona, Croatia Osiguranje Split and Zrinjevac. He then moved to Pallacanestro Trapani in Italy, BC Žalgiris in Lithuania, Krka Telekom in Slovenia, Fenerbahçe in Turkey, Hapoel Migdal Jerusalem in Israel, again Žalgiris, and again Zrinjevac, Croatia Osiguranje Split and Cibona.

One of Arapović's most well-known moments was during the first half of the gold medal game between Croatia and the United States at the 1992 Summer Olympics, when Arapović caught a pass from Toni Kukoč while driving toward the basket and made a running two-handed slam dunk to give Croatia a 25–23 lead over the Dream Team. David Robinson was whistled for a foul on the play, and Arapović demonstratively hung on the rim for several moments before giving the cheering crowd several fist-pumps.

Member of Croatian Democratic Union (HDZ), Arapović was their MP in the Croatian Parliament from December 2003 until January 2008. His son Marko is also a professional basketball player.

References

External links
 
 
 

1965 births
Living people
Basketball players from Mostar
Atlanta Hawks draft picks
BC Žalgiris players
Basketball players at the 1988 Summer Olympics
Basketball players at the 1992 Summer Olympics
Centers (basketball)
Croatian Democratic Union politicians
Croatian expatriate sportspeople in Lithuania
Croatian men's basketball players
Croatian sportsperson-politicians
Croats of Bosnia and Herzegovina
Hapoel Jerusalem B.C. players
Israeli Basketball Premier League players
KK Cibona players
KK Krka players
KK Lokomotiva Mostar players
KK Split players
KK Zrinjevac players
Medalists at the 1988 Summer Olympics
Medalists at the 1992 Summer Olympics
Olympic basketball players of Croatia
Olympic basketball players of Yugoslavia
Olympic medalists in basketball
Olympic silver medalists for Croatia
Olympic silver medalists for Yugoslavia
Representatives in the modern Croatian Parliament
Universiade gold medalists for Yugoslavia
Universiade medalists in basketball
Yugoslav men's basketball players
1986 FIBA World Championship players
KK Kvarner players